Long Creek is a  long 2nd order tributary to Back Creek in Cecil County, Maryland.

Variant names
According to the Geographic Names Information System, it has also been known historically as: 
Long Branch
Margarets Creek

Course
Long Creek rises on the Belltown Run divide at Marabou Meadows in New Castle County, Delaware.  Long Creek then flows southwest into Maryland to meet Back Creek at Dans, Maryland.

Watershed
Long Creek drains  of area, receives about 45.4 in/year of precipitation, has a topographic wetness index of 558.56 and is about 18.3% forested.

See also
List of rivers of Delaware

References 

Rivers of Delaware
Rivers of Maryland
Rivers of New Castle County, Delaware
Rivers of Cecil County, Maryland